The Panam Sports (Formerly Pan American Sports Organization; ;) is an international organization which represents the current 41 National Olympic Committees of the American Continent.

It is affiliated with the International Olympic Committee and its affiliated bodies, including ANOC, the Association of National Olympic Committees, and serves as the continental association of the American Continent.

The organization's flagship event is the quadrennial Pan American Games, held since 1951. The Parapan American Games were inaugurated in 1999 for disabled athletes and are held alongside the able-bodied Pan American Games. The Pan American Winter Games, for winter sports, were held only once in 1990. The Pan American Sports Festival was inaugurated in 2014 as a developmental event for the region's athletes.

Affiliated organizations
There are four regional entities affiliated with Panam Sports, they are:

 CACSO (ODECABE) – organizers of the Central American and Caribbean Games
 ODEBO – organizers of the Bolivarian Games
 ODESUR – organizers of the South American Games
 ORDECA – organizers of the Central American Games

Flag
Just like the International Olympic Committee, Panam Sports has its own flag. In 2017, Panam Sports underwent a complete rebranding of the organization, including changes to its commercial name (now Panam Sports), brand and flag. The modern design emphasizes the unity of Panam Sports' 41 member nations, displaying the entire continent within a seal that features the new commercial name 'Panam Sports' at the top and 'Organization' at the bottom. The Olympic Rings reside below the seal, symbolizing the continental organization's close relationship with the IOC and the Olympic Games. The seal and accompanying rings are centered on the white background of the flag.

The original flag of PASO-ODEPA contained the four words, "América", "Espírito", "Sports" and "Fraternité", each respectively in one of the four official languages of the organization, namely Spanish, Portuguese, English and French. The original flag also displayed a torch along with the Olympic Rings and five circles with the official colors of the Olympics on a white background. Finally, the words PASO and ODEPA were written to indicate the organization the flag represents.

Member countries
In the following table, the year in which the NOC was recognized by the International Olympic Committee (IOC) is also given if it is different from the year in which the NOC was created.

Former member: Netherlands Antilles Olympic Committee

There are some areas not a part of Panam Sports as they are not independent countries:

 Anguilla, the Falkland Islands, Montserrat, and the Turks and Caicos Islands are British Overseas Territories without internal autonomy and so failed to create their own National Olympic committees and so are not members of the Pan American Sports Organization.
 Bonaire, Curaçao, Saba, Sint Eustatius, and Sint Maarten are part of the Dutch Caribbean since 2010. With the dissolution of the Netherlands Antilles later in that year, the athletes from these territories were allowed to compete at the 2011 Pan American Games with the older denomination. This also happened with these athletes at the 2012 Summer Olympics, but they were part of the Independent Olympic Athletes team. Since 2013, athletes from these five territories were absorbed by the Aruban Olympic Committee.
 French Guiana, Guadeloupe, Martinique, Saint Barthélemy, Saint Martin, and Saint Pierre and Miquelon are not members of the Pan American Sports Organization as they are overseas departments and collectivities of France. Nevertheless, French Guiana participated in the 1951 Pan American Games. Guadeloupe and Martinique also competed at the 2003 Games as guests at the shooting events.
 Greenland is an autonomous country within the Kingdom of Denmark and geopolitically associated with Europe, therefore it is the only Northern American country not involved in Panam Sports.

Presidents

 Served as acting president for two months until new election.

Athlete Commission
In 2011, a new Panam Sports Athlete Commission was formed. Former Canadian rhythmic gymnast and three-time Pan American Games gold medalist Alexandra Orlando was selected the president of the commission. The commission will be made up of seven athletes (five current and two former) with two being reserved for non-Olympic sports.

Debut of countries per Games

Exclusion of indigenous sports
Despite criticisms that Ulama or Mesoamerican Ballgame and Lacrosse are not included in the program of the Pan American Games, the number of countries practicing the sport is too small for the sport to be added to the program. As of 2023, there are 19 national federations in the Americas affiliated with World Lacrosse with a minimum number of Panam Sports recognition being 14 (Argentina, Barbados, Bermuda, Canada, United States, Iroquois, Colombia, Costa Rica, Guatemala, Jamaica, Mexico, Peru, Puerto Rico, Chile, Ecuador,  Haiti, the Dominican Republic, Panama, and the United States Virgin Islands). However, the Iroquois nation is not recognized by Panam Sports or the IOC. Thus, there are at this time 14 regional member nations of World Lacrosse, enough for the sport to be included in the Pan Am Games as early as 2027.  Lacrosse is recognized by the Global Association of International Sports Federations and by the International Olympic Committee. However, this is not the case with ulama, which inhibits its participation in the Pan American Games. It is a possibility that lacrosse will be included in the program of the Games in the future.

See also
 Americas Paralympic Committee
 Pan American Games

Notes

References

External links
 

Americas
Pan-American sports governing bodies
Olympic organizations
Sports organizations established in 1940
Organizations based in Mexico City